Jaime Soto (born December 31, 1955) is an American prelate of the Roman Catholic Church.  He has been serving as bishop of the Diocese of Sacramento in Northern California since 2007.  He previously served as an auxiliary bishop of the Diocese of Orange in Southern California from 2000 to 2007.

Biography

Early life and education 
Jaime Soto was born on December 31, 1955, at Daniel Freeman Hospital in Inglewood, California. He is the eldest of seven children of a Mexican family. His father, Oscar Soto, was a telephone company engineer. In 1956, the Soto family moved to Stanton, California, where he attended St. Polycarp School as a child. He also played mass in his backyard with his siblings, knowing he wanted to be a priest as early as the second grade. Soto graduated from Mater Dei High School in Santa Ana, California, in 1974 and he entered St. John's Seminary College in Camarillo, California. He obtained a Bachelor of Philosophy degree there in 1978 and a Master of Divinity degree in 1982.

Priesthood 
Soto was ordained to the priesthood for the Diocese of Orange by Bishop William Robert Johnson on June 12, 1982. After his ordination, Soto was appointed as associate pastor of St. Joseph Parish in Santa Ana.  In 1984, he went to New York City to attend the Columbia University School of Social Work, graduating in 1986 with a Master of Social Work degree. 

After returning to Orange County, Soto was named associate director of Catholic Charities for the diocese. Later that year, he was appointed director of  immigration and citizenship services within the local Catholic Charities. Soto was involved with the implementation of the Immigration Reform and Control Act of 1986 as well.

Soto was appointed episcopal vicar for the Hispanic community in the diocese on March 3, 1989.  He was raised by the Vatican to the rank of honorary prelate in 1990. In addition to his work with the Hispanic community, Soto was named diocesan vicar for charities on March 1, 1999.

Auxiliary Bishop of Orange 
On March 23, 2000, Soto was appointed as an auxiliary bishop of the Diocese of Oranges and titular bishop of Segia by Pope John Paul II. He received his episcopal consecration on May 31, 2000, from Bishop Tod Brown, with Bishops Michael Driscoll and Norman  McFarland serving as co-consecrators. On June 11, 2003, Soto served as a principal co-consecrator for Auxiliary Bishop Dominic Mai Luong. Soto attended World Youth Day 2005 in Cologne, Germany, joining nine other American bishops in leading catechetical sessions.

Coadjutor Bishop and Bishop of Sacramento
Soto was named as coadjutor bishop of the Diocese of Sacramento on October 11, 2007, being installed on November 19, 2007, in the Cathedral of the Blessed Sacrament. He automatically became bishop of Sacramento on November 30, 2008 on the retirement of his predecessor, Bishop William Weigand.

Soto became the 25th Hispanic bishop in the United States. Soto believes that the Catholic Church in America is in a "dire need" for a greater number of Spanish-speaking clergy. He is in favor of a larger role for Latinos in the church community. His self-proclaimed greatest achievements have been counseling Hispanics diagnosed with HIV/AIDS, leading monthly services for inmates at the Orange County Jail, and promoting such Hispanic rituals and events as the Procession of Our Lady of Guadalupe and the Day of the Dead.

USCCB committee positions 
Within the United States Conference of Catholic Bishops (USCCB), Soto is chair of the USCCB Committee on Cultural Diversity in the Church, a member of the Committee on Evangelization and Catechesis, and a consultant to the Committee on International Justice and Peace. He is also the chairman of the Catholic Legal Immigration Network, Inc. (CLINIC).

On November 17, 2010, Soto was appointed as the head of the Catholic Campaign for Human Development (CCHD), a USCCB agency. The CCHD faced allegations that it funded groups advocating abortion rights, contraception rights and contraception and same-sex marriage. These reports led a coalition of conservative Catholic and anti-abortion groups to launch a boycott of the national collection.  At least ten American bishops announced support for the boycott. Soto's appointment came one day after Archbishop Timothy Dolan was elected USCCB president.

Positions on issues

LGBT rights 

Soto is seen as a defender of "conservative" Catholic values. In 2008, Soto spoke at a conference for the National Association of Catholic Diocesan Lesbian and Gay Ministries, saying that the "homosexual lifestyle" is sinful. Soto stated: 

"Sexual relations between people of the same sex can be alluring for homosexuals but it deviates from the true meaning of the act and distracts them from the true nature of love to which God has called us all. For this reason, it is sinful."

Premarital sex and contraception 
In the same speech, Soto spoke against premarital sex stating: "Sexual intercourse, outside of the marriage covenant between a man and a woman, can be alluring and intoxicating but it will not lead to that liberating journey of true self-discovery and an authentic discovery of God. For that reason, it is sinful." Soto has lamented that contraception has become “the unquestioned default mode of marriage.”

Abortion 
Soto has officially endorsed the Sacramento Helpers of God's Precious Infants group and has led prayer vigils outside clinics providing abortion services to women.

Immigration 
Soto has encouraged Catholics to read the Bible so as to better understand the church’s stance on immigration and its long-standing support for the rights of immigrants. Soto believes that comprehensive immigration reform, if done properly taking into account the concerns of all affected parties, would benefit the country as a whole.

Honors
In 2003, Soto was inducted to the inaugural Mater Dei High School Ring of Honor. Soto was recognized during the annual spring Ring of Honor and Founders Circle Dinner for his contributions towards their community.

See also

 Catholic Church hierarchy
 Catholic Church in the United States
 Historical list of the Catholic bishops of the United States
 List of Catholic bishops of the United States
 Lists of patriarchs, archbishops, and bishops

Sources
 Biographical Summary The Most Reverend Jaime Soto www.diocese-sacramento Retrieved: 2010-04-30
 Bishops www.diocese-sacramento Retrieved: 2010-04-30

References

External links
 Roman Catholic Diocese of Sacramento Official Website
Diocesan Bishop The Most Reverend Jaime Soto Retrieved: 2010-03-13
 "Resign Unfaithful Bishops"

Episcopal succession

Roman Catholic bishops of Sacramento
21st-century Roman Catholic bishops in the United States
1955 births
Living people
People from Inglewood, California
Roman Catholic Diocese of Orange
St. John's Seminary (California) alumni
Columbia University School of Social Work alumni
Religious leaders from California
People from Stanton, California
American people of Mexican descent